The men's 15,000 m points elimination race in inline speed skating at the 2001 World Games took place on 26 August 2001 at the Akita Prefectural Skating Rink in Akita, Japan.

Competition format
A total of 23 athletes entered the competition. Athlete with the most points is the winner.

Results

References

External links
 Results on IWGA website

Inline speed skating at the 2001 World Games